Oliwia Bałuk (born ) is a Polish volleyball player. She is part of the Poland women's national volleyball team.

She participated in the 2017 Girls' U18 Volleyball European Championship, 2017 FIVB Volleyball Women's U20 World Championship,  and 2018 FIVB Volleyball Women's Nations League.
On club level she played for KPS Chemik Police.

References

External links 

 CEV profile
 FIVB profile
 https://www.teamusa.org/USA-Volleyball/Features/2018/May/04/Look-Inside-US-Womens-VNL-Opponents
 Poland’s Baluk happy about the win and their performance | FIVB - Press release

2000 births
Living people
Polish women's volleyball players
Place of birth missing (living people)